The Fred Marquis Pinellas Trail is a rail trail in Pinellas County, Florida. It stretches from Tarpon Springs in the north to St. Petersburg in the south, passing through the towns of Palm Harbor, Dunedin, Belleair, Clearwater, Largo, Seminole, South Pasadena, and Gulfport. It is utilized for walking, jogging, and cycling.  Some trail users are able to commute to work using the Pinellas Trail instead of a motor vehicle.

History

The Atlantic Coast Line (ACL) and the Seaboard Air Line (SAL) railroads both served St. Petersburg and Clearwater for many years. They merged in 1967 to form the Seaboard Coast Line Railroad (SCL), which consolidated the existing infrastructure. After the SCL joined CSX Transportation in the 1980s,  of trackage in Pinellas County was abandoned, and purchased by the Florida Department of Transportation. After voter approval, the County acquired the property and began construction of the Pinellas Trail.

The first  opened in December 1990, linking John S. Taylor Park in Largo to Seminole City Park in Seminole. With the passage of the first Penny for Pinellas one-cent local option sales tax, plans were made to construct additional segments along the former railroad corridor.

The Pinellas Trail is named after Fred Marquis, a former Pinellas County Administrator who served from 1979 until 2000.

The Pinellas Trail is composed of the following railroad segments: 
Former Orange Belt Railway (later Atlantic Coast Line Railroad) from Tarpon Springs to Clearwater
Former Tampa and Gulf Coast Railroad (later Seaboard Air Line Railroad) from Clearwater to St. Petersburg

Future

Hazards
Unlike most rail-trails that traverse rural countrysides, the Pinellas Trail travels through several urban areas.

When traveling through some of the neighborhoods in sections of St. Petersburg and Tarpon Springs, trail users are encouraged to be cautious. In Clearwater, the same warning applies; trail users may have the right-of-way in areas with minimal vehicular traffic, but they do not when the trail crosses a major artery such as State Road 60.

See also

Tarpon Springs Depot
Dunedin History Museum
Seaboard Coast Line Railroad station (St. Petersburg, Florida)
Clearwater Subdivision

References

External links

 Official Website
 Pinellas Trails, Inc.
 Florida Department of Environmental Protection: Greenways & Trails
 American Trails
 RailsToTrails.us Page For Pinellas Trail
 Pinellas Trail Guide
 Pinellas County Metropolitan Planning Organization
 A Short History of the Pinellas County Trail System
 Pinellas Trail at 100 Florida Trails 

Bike paths in Florida
Former CSX Transportation lines
National Recreation Trails in Florida
Protected areas of Pinellas County, Florida
Rail trails in Florida
Transportation in Pinellas County, Florida
1990 establishments in Florida